Coller is a surname. Notable people with the surname include:

 Amrose B. Coller (1885–1951), American politician
 Jeremy Coller (born 1958), British businessman and philanthropist
 Julius A. Coller (1859-1940), American lawyer and politician
 Ray Coller (1907–1969), Australian rules footballer

See also
 Colker